The São Nicolau Island League is a regional championship played in São Nicolau Island, Cape Verde. The winner of the championship plays in Cape Verdean football Championships of each season.  The league was formed in the 1980s.  The competition is organized by the São Nicolau Regional Football Association (Associação Regional de Futebol de São Nicolau, ARFSN).

Three clubs has ever won titles, the most is SC Atlético with fourteen, FC Ultramarina with twelve and Desportivo Ribeira Brava with three.  Ultramarina won a championship every two years between 2007 and 2017 while Atlético Ribeira Brava won every two years between 2012 and 2016. Its 2018 champion is the next first timer in 27 years and will be FC Belo Horizonte of Juncalinho.

São Nicolau Island League - Clubs 2017-18
The league has eight clubs.

Académica da Preguiça
Ajat SN  - Tarrafal de São Nicolau
Atlético São Nicolau  - Ribeira Brava
Belo Horizonte  - Juncalinho
Praia Branca 
Ribeira Brava 
Talho
Ultramarina Tarrafal

Former club
Calejão

Winners
1983: SC Atlético
1984: unknown, one possible winner one season may be FC Ultramarina or SC Atlético
1985: Desportivo Ribeira Brava
1986/87 : SC Atlético
1988-90: unknown, one possible winner one season may be FC Ultramarina or SC Atlético
1990/91 : Desportivo Ribeira Brava
1992-93: unknown - one possible winner one seasonmay be SC Atlético
1993/94 : SC Atlético
1994/95 : SC Atlético
1995/96 : FC Ultramarina
1996/97 : unknown
1997/98: SC Atlético/Desportivo Ribeira Brava?
1998/99 : FC Ultramarina
1999/00 : SC Atlético
2000/01 : FC Ultramarina
2001/02 : SC Atlético
2002/03 : FC Ultramarina
2003/04 : FC Ultramarina
2004/05 : Desportivo Ribeira Brava
2005/06 : FC Ultramarina
2006/07 : FC Ultramarina
2007/08 : Desportivo Ribeira Brava
2008/09 : FC Ultramarina
2009/10 : Desportivo Ribeira Brava
2010/11 : FC Ultramarina
2011/12 : SC Atlético
2012/13 : FC Ultramarina
2013/14 : SC Atlético Ribeira Brava
2014/15 : FC Ultramarina
2015-16 : SC Atlético Ribeira Brava
2016–17: FC Ultramarina
2017–18: FC Belo Horizonte

Performance By Club

Performance by municipality

See also
São Nicolau Cup
São Nicolau Super Cup
São Nicolau Opening Tournament

References

External links
São Nicolau Island League 

 
Second level football leagues in Cape Verde
Association football governing bodies in Cape Verde
Sport in São Nicolau, Cape Verde